The 2017 Canadian Senior Curling Championships were held March 20 to 25, 2017 in Fredericton, New Brunswick.

Men's

Teams
The teams are listed as follows:

Round Robin Standings
Final Round Robin Standings

Championship Pool Standings
Final Round Robin Standings

Seeding Pool Standings
Final Standings

Playoffs

Women

Teams
The teams are listed as follows:

Round Robin Standings
Final Round Robin Standings

Championship Pool Standings
Final Round Robin Standings

Seeding Pool Standings
Final Round Robin Standings

Playoffs

References

External links

2017 in Canadian curling
Canadian Senior Curling Championships
Curling competitions in Fredericton
March 2017 sports events in Canada
2017 in New Brunswick